Greenfield Mowers Racing was a motor racing team that competed in Australia from the early 1990s until 2000.

History
Greenfield Mowers Racing first came to national prominence competing in the 1995 Australian Sports Sedan Championship with Cameron McLean winning the series in an ex Tony Longhurst Racing BMW M3. At the end of 1995, Tony Longhurst's 1994 Australian 2 litre Championship winning BMW 318i was purchased from Steven Ellery Racing and debuted at the Australian Grand Prix support race. McLean raced it throughout the 1996 Australian Super Touring Championship.

For 1997, a Ray Mallock built Opel Vectra was purchased from South Africa. For 1998 Paul Morris' championship winning BMW 320i was purchased.

In 1999, the team switched to V8 Supercars with an ex Dick Johnson Racing Ford Falcon EL. In 2000, an ex Paul Weel Racing Falcon AU was purchased.

Many of the staff and some of the team's equipment would move to Paragon Motorsport for the 2001 season.

References

Australian auto racing teams
Auto racing teams disestablished in 2000
Sports teams in Queensland
2000 disestablishments in Australia
Supercars Championship teams